This List of members of the American Academy of Arts and Letters Department of Literature shows the members of one of the three departments of the American Academy of Arts and Letters.

After being nominated by current members, new members are selected in two elections, the first by the department they join (Art, Literature or Music). Candidates who receive the most votes in their own department are then voted on by the entire membership.

A
 Renata Adler – 1987
 Sherman Alexie – 2015
 Isabel Allende – 2004
 Roger Angell – 2015
 Kwame Anthony Appiah – 2008
 Paul Auster – 2006

B
 Russell Banks – 1998 
 John Barth – 1974
 Ann Beattie – 1992
 Louis Begley – 2011
 Eric Bentley – 1990
 Wendell Berry – 2014
 Frank Bidart – 2006
 Harold Bloom – 1990
 Robert Bly – 1987
 T. Coraghessan Boyle – 2009
 Robert Brustein – 1999

C
 Peter Carey – 2016
 Robert A. Caro – 2008
 Michael Chabon – 2012
Ron Chernow – 2018
 Henri Cole – 2017
 Billy Collins – 2016
 Robert Coover – 1987
 Michael Cunningham – 2011

D
 Don DeLillo – 1989 
 Junot Diaz – 2017 
 Joan Didion – 1981
 Annie Dillard – 1999 
 Rita Dove – 2011

E
 Dave Eggers – 2015
 Deborah Eisenberg – 2007
 Louise Erdrich – 1998
Jeffrey Eugenides – 2018

F
 Jules Feiffer – 1995
 Lawrence Ferlinghetti – 2003
 Richard Ford – 1998
 Jonathan Franzen – 2012
 Ian Frazier - 2019

G
 Ernest J. Gaines – 1998 
 Henry Louis Gates, Jr. – 1999 
 Louise Glück – 1996
 Mary Gordon – 2007
 Jorie Graham – 2009
 Stephen Greenblatt – 2008
 John Guare – 1989 
 Allan Gurganus – 2007

H

 Robert Hass – 2002
 Amy Hempel – 2017
 Edward Hirsch – 2017
 Edward Hoagland – 1982
Maxine Hong Kingstone – 2018
 Richard Howard – 1983

I
 John Irving – 2001

J
 Ha Jin – 2014
 Diane Johnson – 1999
 Ward Just – 2013
 Edward P. Jones -2019

K
 Garrison Keillor –  2001
 William Kennedy – 1993
 Jamaica Kincaid – 2004 
 Yusef Komunyakaa – 2009
 Jane Kramer – 2016
 Tony Kushner – 2005

L
 Jhumpa Lahiri – 2012
 Alison Lurie – 1989

M
 Janet Malcolm – 2001
 David Mamet – 1994
 Colum McCann – 2017
 David McCullough – 2006
 Thomas McGuane – 2010
Terrence McNally – 2018
 John McPhee – 1988
 Lorrie Moore – 2006
 Toni Morrison – 1981 
 Paul Muldoon – 2008

N
Lynn Nottage – 2018

O

Joyce Carol Oates – 1978
Sharon Olds – 2015
Cynthia Ozick – 1988

P
Suzan-Lori Parks - 2019
Ann Patchett – 2017
Jayne Anne Philips – 2018
Robert Pinsky – 1999
Richard Powers – 2010
Richard Price – 2009
Francine Prose – 2010
Annie Proulx – 2007

R
 Claudia Rankine - 2019
 David Remnick – 2016
 Marilynne Robinson – 2010
 Kay Ryan – 2017

S
George Saunders – 2018
Stacy Schiff - 2019
Grace Schulman - 2019
David Sedaris - 2019
Grace Schulman - 2019
Wallace Shawn – 2006
 Charles Simic – 1995
 Jane Smiley – 2001

 Gary Snyder – 1987
 Elizabeth Spencer – 1985
 Art Spiegelman – 2015

T
 Paul Theroux – 1984
 Natasha Trethewey - 2019
 Calvin Trillin – 2008
 Anne Tyler – 1983

V
 Helen Hennessy Vendler – 1993

W
 Rosanna Warren – 2005
 Edmund White – 1996
 John Edgar Wideman – 2016
 Joy Williams – 2008
 Terry Tempest Williams - 2019
 Garry Wills – 1995
 Tobias Wolff – 2014
 Charles Wright – 1995

Deceased members

See also
List of members of the American Academy of Arts and Letters Department of Art
List of members of the American Academy of Arts and Letters Department of Music

External links
List of members of the Department of Literature of the American Academy of Arts and Letters

Learned societies of the United States